Jeffrey Preston Bezos (born January 12, 1964) is an American entrepreneur, media proprietor, investor, and commercial astronaut. He is the founder, executive chairman, and former president and CEO of Amazon. With a net worth of US$128 billion as of February 2023, Bezos is the third-wealthiest person in the world and was the wealthiest from 2017 to 2021 according to both Bloomberg's Billionaires Index and Forbes.

Born in Albuquerque and raised in Houston and Miami, Bezos graduated from Princeton University in 1986. He holds a degree in electrical engineering and computer science. He worked on Wall Street in a variety of related fields from 1986 to early 1994. Bezos founded Amazon in late 1994 on a road trip from New York City to Seattle. The company began as an online bookstore and has since expanded to a variety of other e-commerce products and services, including video and audio streaming, cloud computing, and artificial intelligence. It is the world's largest online sales company, the largest Internet company by revenue, and the largest provider of virtual assistants and cloud infrastructure services through its Amazon Web Services branch.

Bezos founded the aerospace manufacturer and sub-orbital spaceflight services company Blue Origin in 2000. Blue Origin's New Shepard vehicle reached space in 2015 and afterwards successfully landed back on Earth; he flew into space on Blue Origin NS-16 in 2021. He also purchased the major American newspaper The Washington Post in 2013 for $250 million and manages many other investments through his venture capital firm, Bezos Expeditions. In September 2021, Bezos co-founded biotechnology company Altos Labs with Mail.ru founder Yuri Milner.

The first centibillionaire on the Forbes wealth index, Bezos was named the "richest man in modern history" after his net worth increased to $150 billion in July 2018. In August 2020, according to Forbes, he had a net worth exceeding $200 billion. In 2020 during the COVID-19 pandemic, his wealth grew by approximately $24 billion. On July 5, 2021, Bezos stepped down as the CEO and President of Amazon and transferred to the role of executive chairman; Andy Jassy, the chief of Amazon's cloud computing division, succeeded Bezos as the CEO and President of Amazon. On July 20, 2021, he flew to space alongside his half-brother, Mark. In September 2022, he was ranked second on the Forbes 400 list of wealthiest Americans with a net worth of $151 billion.

Early life 
Jeffrey Preston Jorgensen was born in Albuquerque, New Mexico, on January 12, 1964, the son of Jacklyn (née Gise) and Theodore Jørgensen. At the time of Jeff's birth, his mother was a 17-year-old high-school student and his father was 19 years old. Jørgensen was a Danish American and was born in Chicago to a family of Baptists. After completing high school despite challenging conditions, Jacklyn attended night school while bringing Jeff along as a baby. Jeff attended a Montessori school in Albuquerque, New Mexico, when he was two years old. After his parents divorced, his mother married Cuban immigrant Miguel "Mike" Bezos in April 1968. Shortly after the wedding, Mike adopted four-year-old Jeff whose surname was then legally changed from Jorgensen to Bezos.

After Mike had received his degree from the University of New Mexico, the family moved to Houston, Texas, so that he could begin working as an engineer for Exxon. Jeff attended River Oaks Elementary School in Houston from fourth to sixth grade. Jeff's maternal grandfather was Lawrence Preston Gise, a regional director of the U.S. Atomic Energy Commission (AEC) in Albuquerque. Lawrence retired early to his family's ranch near Cotulla, Texas, where Jeff would spend many summers in his youth. Jeff displayed scientific interests and technological proficiency and once rigged an electric alarm to keep his younger siblings out of his room. The family moved to Miami, Florida, where Jeff attended Miami Palmetto High School. While Jeff was in high school, he worked at McDonald's as a short-order line cook during the breakfast shift.

Bezos attended the Student Science Training Program at the University of Florida. He was high school valedictorian, a National Merit Scholar, and a Silver Knight Award winner in 1982. In his graduation speech, Bezos told the audience he dreamed of the day when mankind would colonize space. A local newspaper quoted his intention "to get all people off the earth and see it turned into a huge national park". In 1986, he graduated summa cum laude from Princeton University with a 4.2 GPA and a Bachelor of Science in Engineering degree (B.S.E.) in electrical engineering and computer science; he was also a member of Phi Beta Kappa. While at Princeton, Bezos was a member of the Quadrangle Club, one of Princeton's 11 eating clubs. In addition, he was elected to Tau Beta Pi and was the president of the Princeton chapter of the Students for the Exploration and Development of Space (SEDS).

Business career

Early career 
After Bezos graduated from college in 1986, he was offered jobs at Intel, Bell Labs, and Andersen Consulting, among others. He first worked at Fitel, a fintech telecommunications start-up, where he was tasked with building a network for international trade. Bezos was promoted to head of development and director of customer service thereafter. He transitioned into the banking industry when he became a product manager at Bankers Trust from 1988 to 1990. He then joined D. E. Shaw & Co, a newly created hedge fund with a strong emphasis on mathematical modelling in 1990 until 1994. Bezos became D. E. Shaw's fourth senior vice-president by age 30.

Amazon 

In late 1993, Bezos read that the Internet was growing at a rate of 2300% a year and decided to establish an online bookstore. He and his then-wife, MacKenzie Scott, left their jobs at D. E. Shaw and founded Amazon in a rented garage in Bellevue, Washington on July 5, 1994, after writing its business plan on a cross-country drive from New York City to Seattle. With Bezos at the helm and Scott taking an integral role in its operation—writing checks, keeping track of the books, and negotiating the company's first freight contracts—the foundation was laid for this garage-run operation to grow exponentially. Prior to settling on Seattle, Bezos had investigated setting up his company at an Indian reservation near San Francisco in order to avoid paying taxes. Bezos initially named his new company Cadabra but later changed the name to Amazon after the Amazon River in South America, in part because the name begins with the letter A, which is at the beginning of the alphabet. At the time, website listings were alphabetized, so a name starting with "A" would appear sooner when customers conducted online searches. In addition, he regarded "Amazon," the name of the world's largest river as fitting for what he hoped would become the world's largest online bookstore. He accepted an estimated $300,000 from his parents as investment in Amazon. He warned many early investors that there was a 70% chance that Amazon would fail or go bankrupt. Although Amazon was originally an online bookstore, Bezos had always planned to expand to other products. Three years after Bezos founded Amazon, he took it public with an initial public offering (IPO). In response to critical reports from Fortune and Barron's, Bezos maintained that the growth of the Internet would overtake competition from larger book retailers such as Borders and Barnes & Noble.

In 1998, Bezos diversified into the online sale of music and video, and by the end of the year he had expanded the company's products to include a variety of other consumer goods. Bezos used the $54 million raised during the company's 1997 equity offering to finance aggressive acquisition of smaller competitors. In 2000, Bezos borrowed $2 billion from banks, as its cash balances dipped to only $350 million. In 2002, Bezos led Amazon to launch Amazon Web Services, which compiled data from weather channels and website traffic. In late 2002, rapid spending from Amazon caused it financial distress when revenues stagnated. After the company nearly went bankrupt, he closed distribution centers and laid off 14% of the Amazon workforce. In 2003, Amazon rebounded from financial instability and turned a profit of $400 million. In November 2007, Bezos launched the Amazon Kindle. According to a 2008 Time profile, Bezos wished to create a device that allowed a "flow state" in reading similar to the experience of video games. In 2013, Bezos secured a $600-million contract with the Central Intelligence Agency (CIA) on behalf of Amazon Web Services. In October of that year, Amazon was recognized as the largest online shopping retailer in the world.

In May 2016, Bezos sold slightly more than one million shares of his holdings in the company for $671 million, the largest sum he had ever raised from selling some of his Amazon stock. On August 4, 2016, Bezos sold another million of his shares for $756.7 million. A year later, Bezos took on 130,000 new employees when he ramped up hiring at company distribution centers. By January 19, 2018, his Amazon stock holdings had appreciated to slightly over $109 billion; months later he began to sell stock to raise cash for other enterprises, in particular, Blue Origin. On January 29, 2018, he was featured in Amazon's Super Bowl commercial. On February 1, 2018, Amazon reported its highest ever profit with quarterly earnings of $2 billion. Due to the growth of Alibaba in China, Bezos has often expressed interest in expanding Amazon into India. On July 27, 2017, Bezos momentarily became the world's wealthiest person over Microsoft co-founder Bill Gates when his estimated net worth increased to just over $90 billion. His wealth surpassed $100 billion for the first time on November 24, 2017, and he was formally designated the wealthiest person in the world by Forbes on March 6, 2018, with a net worth of $112 billion.

In March 2018, Bezos dispatched Amit Agarwal, Amazon's global senior vice president, to India with $5.5 billion to localize operations throughout the company's supply chain routes. Later in the month, U.S. President Donald Trump accused Amazon and Bezos, specifically of sales tax avoidance, misusing postal routes, and anti-competitive business practices. Amazon's share price fell by 9% in response to the President's negative comments; this reduced Bezos's personal wealth by $10.7 billion. Weeks later, Bezos recouped his losses when academic reports out of Stanford University indicated that Trump could do little to regulate Amazon in any meaningful way. During July 2018, a number of members of the U.S. Congress called on Bezos to detail the applications of Amazon's face recognition software, Rekognition.

Criticism of Amazon's business practices continued in September 2018 when Senator Bernie Sanders introduced the Stop Bad Employers by Zeroing Out Subsidies (Stop BEZOS) Act and accused Amazon of receiving corporate welfare. This followed revelations by the non-profit group New Food Economy which found that one third of Amazon workers in Arizona, and one tenth of Amazon workers in Pennsylvania and Ohio, relied on food stamps. While preparing to introduce the bill, Sanders opined: "Instead of attempting to explore Mars or go to the moon, how about Jeff Bezos pays his workers a living wage?" He later said: "Bezos could play a profound role. If he said today, nobody who is employed at Amazon will receive less than a living wage, it would send a message to every corporation in America." Sanders's efforts elicited a response from Amazon which pointed to the 130,000 jobs it created in 2017 and called the $28,446 figure for its median salary "misleading" as it included part-time workers. However, Sanders countered that the companies targeted by his proposal have placed an increased focus on part-time workers to escape benefit obligations. On October 2, 2018, Bezos announced a company-wide wage increase, which Sanders applauded. The American workers who were being paid the minimum wage had this increased to $15 per hour, a decision that was interpreted as support for the Fight for $15 movement.

In February 2021, Bezos announced that in the third quarter of 2021 he would step down from his role as CEO of Amazon to become the Executive Chairman of the Amazon Board. He was succeeded as CEO by Andy Jassy. On February 2, 2021, Bezos sent an email to all Amazon employees, telling them the transition would give him "the time and energy [he] need[s] to focus on the Day 1 Fund, the Bezos Earth Fund, Blue Origin, The Washington Post, and [his] other passions."

Blue Origin 

In September 2000, Bezos founded Blue Origin, a human spaceflight startup. Bezos has long expressed an interest in space travel and the development of human life in the Solar System. His 1982 high school valedictorian senior graduation speech was followed up with a Miami Herald interview in which he expressed an interest to build and develop hotels, amusement parks, and colonies for human beings who were in orbit. The 18-year-old Bezos stated that he wanted to preserve Earth from overuse through resource depletion. Rob Meyerson led Blue Origin from 2003 to 2017 and served as its first president.

After its founding, Blue Origin maintained a low profile until 2006 when it purchased a large tract of land in West Texas for a launch and test facility. After the company gained the public's attention during the late 2000s, Bezos additionally indicated his interest in reducing the cost of space travel for humans while also increasing the safety of extraterrestrial travel. In September 2011, one of the company's unmanned prototype vehicles crashed during a short-hop test flight. Although the crash was viewed as a setback, news outlets noted how far the company went from its founding-to-date in advancing spaceflight. After the crash, Bezos has been superstitiously wearing his "lucky" Texas Cowboy boots to all rocket launches. In May 2013, Bezos met with Richard Branson, chairman of Virgin Galactic, to discuss commercial spaceflight opportunities and strategies. He has been compared to Branson and Elon Musk as all three are billionaires who prioritize spaceflight among their business interests.

In 2015, Bezos announced that a new orbital launch vehicle was under development and would make its first flight in the late-2010s. Later in November, Blue Origin's New Shepard space vehicle successfully rocketed into space and reached its planned test altitude of 329,839 feet (100.5 kilometers) before executing a vertical landing back at the launch site in West Texas. In 2016, Bezos allowed select journalists to visit, tour, and photograph his facility. He has repeatedly called for increased inter-space energy and industrial manufacturing to decrease the negative costs associated with business-related pollution.

In December 2017, New Shepard successfully flew and landed dummy passengers, amending and pushing its human space travel start date into late 2018. To execute this program, Blue Origin built six of the vehicles to support all phases of testing and operations: no-passenger test flights, flights with test passengers, and commercial-passenger weekly operations. Since 2016, Bezos has spoken more freely about his hopes to colonize the solar system, and has been selling US$1 billion in Amazon stock each year to capitalize Blue Origin in an effort to support this endeavor. In May 2018, Bezos maintained that the primary goal of Blue Origin is to preserve the natural resources of Earth by making the human species multi-planetary. He announced that New Shepard would begin transporting humans into sub-orbital space by November 2018. In July 2018, it was announced that Bezos had priced commercial spaceflight tickets from $200,000 to $300,000 per person.

On July 20, 2021, he launched on the NS-16 mission with his half-brother Mark Bezos, Wally Funk, and Oliver Daemen. He launched nine days after Richard Branson launched onboard The Virgin Galactic Unity 22 mission.

The Washington Post 

On August 5, 2013, Bezos announced his purchase of The Washington Post for $250 million in cash, at the suggestion of his friend, Don Graham. To execute the sale, he established limited liability company Nash Holdings to serve as a holding company through which he would own the newspaper. The sale closed on October 1, 2013, and Nash Holdings took control. In March 2014, Bezos made his first significant change at The Washington Post and lifted the online paywall for subscribers of a number of U.S. local newspapers in Texas, Hawaii, and Minnesota. In January 2016, Bezos set out to reinvent the newspaper as a media and technology company by reconstructing its digital media, mobile platforms, and analytics software. After a surge in online readership in 2016, the paper was profitable for the first time since Bezos made the purchase in 2013.

Bezos Expeditions 

Bezos makes personal investments through his venture capital vehicle, Bezos Expeditions. He was one of the first shareholders in Google, when he invested $250,000 in 1998. That $250,000 investment resulted in 3.3 million shares of Google stock, worth about $3.1 billion in 2017. He also invested in Unity Biotechnology, a life-extension research firm hoping to slow or stop the process of aging. Bezos is involved in the healthcare sector, which includes investments in Unity Biotechnology, GRAIL, Juno Therapeutics, and Zocdoc. In January 2018, an announcement was made concerning Bezos's role within a new, unnamed healthcare company. This venture, later named Haven, is expected to be a partnership between Amazon, JPMorgan, and Berkshire Hathaway.

Bezos also supports philanthropic efforts through direct donations and non-profit projects funded by Bezos Expeditions. Bezos used Bezos Expeditions to fund several philanthropic projects, including an Innovation center at the Seattle Museum of History and Industry and the Bezos Center for Neural Circuit Dynamics at Princeton Neuroscience Institute. In 2013, Bezos Expeditions funded the recovery of two Saturn V first-stage Rocketdyne F-1 engines from the floor of the Atlantic Ocean. They were positively identified as belonging to the Apollo 11 mission's S-1C stage from July 1969. The engines are currently on display at the Seattle Museum of Flight.

Altos Labs 

In September 2021, Bezos co-founded Altos Labs with Mail.ru founder Yuri Milner. Altos Labs is a generously funded biotechnology company dedicated to harnessing cellular reprogramming to develop longevity therapeutics. The company has recruited prominent scientists such as Juan Carlos Izpisúa Belmonte (known for work on rejuvenation through reprogramming), Steve Horvath (known for work in epigenetic aging clocks), and Shinya Yamanaka (the Nobel Prize-winning inventor of cellular reprogramming in mammalian cells).

The company left stealth mode and launched on January 19, 2022, with a start capital of $3 billion and an executive team led by Hal Barron.

Public image 

Journalist Nellie Bowles of The New York Times has described the public persona and personality of Bezos as that of "a brilliant but mysterious and coldblooded corporate titan". During the 1990s, Bezos earned a reputation for relentlessly pushing Amazon forward, often at the expense of public charity and social welfare. Journalist Mark O'Connell criticized Bezos's relentless customer focus as "very small" in terms of impact on humanity as a whole, a sentiment technologist Tim O'Reilly agreed with. His business practices projected a public image of prudence and parsimony with his own wealth and that of Amazon. Bezos was a multi-billionaire who drove a 1996 Honda Accord. Throughout the early 2000s, he was perceived to be geeky or nerdy.

Bezos was seen by some as needlessly quantitative and data-driven. This perception was detailed by Alan Deutschman, who described him as "talking in lists" and "[enumerating] the criteria, in order of importance, for every decision he has made." Select accounts of his persona have drawn controversy and public attention. Notably, journalist Brad Stone wrote a book that described Bezos as a demanding boss as well as hyper-competitive, and opined that Bezos perhaps "bet the biggest on the Internet" than anyone else. Bezos has been characterized as a notoriously opportunistic CEO who operates with little concern for obstacles and externalities.

During the early 2010s, Bezos solidified his reputation for aggressive business practices, and his public image began to shift. Bezos started to wear tailored clothing; he weight trained, pursued a regimented diet and began to freely spend his money. His physical transformation has been compared to the transformation of Amazon; he is often referred to as the metonym of the company. His physical appearance increased the public's perception of him as a symbolically dominant figure in business and in popular culture, wherein he has been parodied as an enterprising supervillain. Since 2017, he has been portrayed by Kyle Mooney and Steve Carell on Saturday Night Live, usually as an undercutting, domineering figure. In May 2014, the International Trade Union Confederation named Bezos the "World's Worst Boss", with its general secretary Sharan Burrow saying: "Jeff Bezos represents the inhumanity of employers who are promoting the North American corporate model", while in 2019, Harvard Business Review, which ranked Bezos the best-performing CEO for 4 years in a row since 2014, did not rank him even in the top 100, citing Amazon's "relatively low ESG (environment, social, and governance) scores" that reflect "risks created by working conditions and employment policies, data security, and antitrust issues."

During the late 2010s, Bezos reversed his reputation for being reluctant to spend money on non-business-related expenses. His relative lack of philanthropy compared to other billionaires has drawn a negative response from the public since 2016. Bezos has been known to publicly contest claims made in critical articles, as exemplified in 2015 when he sent a memo to employees denouncing a New York Times piece.

Leadership style 
Bezos used what he called a "regret-minimization framework" while he worked at D. E. Shaw and again during the early years of Amazon. He described this life philosophy by stating: "When I'm 80, am I going to regret leaving Wall Street? No. Will I regret missing the beginning of the Internet? Yes." During the 1990s and early 2000s at Amazon, he was characterized as trying to quantify all aspects of running the company, often listing employees on spreadsheets and basing executive decisions on data. To push Amazon forward, Bezos developed the mantra "Get Big Fast", establishing the company's need to scale its operations to produce market dominance. He favored diverting Amazon profits back into the company in lieu of allocating it amongst shareholders in the form of dividends.

Bezos uses the term "work–life harmony" instead of the more standard "work–life balance" because he believes that balance implies that you can only have one and not the other. He believes that work and home life are interconnected, informing and calibrating each other. Journalist Walt Mossberg dubbed the idea that someone who cannot tolerate criticism or critique shouldn't do anything new or interesting "The Bezos Principle". Bezos does not schedule early morning meetings and enforces a two-pizza rule—a preference that meetings are small enough for two pizzas to feed everyone in the boardroom. When interviewing candidates for jobs at Amazon, he has stated he considers three inquiries: can he admire the person, can the person raise the common standard, and under what circumstances could the person become exemplary.

He meets with Amazon investors for a total of only six hours a year. Instead of using presentation slides, Bezos requires high-level employees to present information with six-page narratives. Starting in 1998, Bezos publishes an annual letter for Amazon shareholders wherein he frequently refers to five principles: focus on customers, not competitors; take risks for market leadership; facilitate staff morale; build a company culture; and empower people. Bezos maintains the email address jeff@amazon.com as an outlet for customers to reach out to him and the company. Although he does not respond to the emails, he forwards some of them with a question mark in the subject line to executives who attempt to address the issues. Bezos has cited Jeff Immelt (of New Enterprise Associates), Warren Buffett (of Berkshire Hathaway), Jamie Dimon (of JPMorgan Chase), and Bob Iger (of Walt Disney) as major influences on his leadership style.

Recognition 
 In 1999, Bezos received his first major award when Time named him Person of the Year.
 In 2008, he was selected by U.S. News & World Report as one of America's best leaders.
 Bezos was awarded an honorary doctorate in science and technology from Carnegie Mellon University in 2008.
 In 2011, The Economist gave Bezos and Gregg Zehr an Innovation Award for the Amazon Kindle.
 In 2012, Bezos was named Businessperson of the Year by Fortune.
 He is also a member of the Bilderberg Group and attended the 2011 Bilderberg conference in St. Moritz, Switzerland, and the 2013 conference in Watford, Hertfordshire, England. He was a member of the executive committee of The Business Council for 2011 and 2012.
 2014–2018, he was ranked the best-performing CEO in the world by Harvard Business Review.
 He has also figured in Fortunes list of 50 great leaders of the world for three straight years, topping the list in 2015.
 In September 2016, Bezos received a $250,000 prize for winning the Heinlein Prize for Advances in Space Commercialization, which he donated to the Students for the Exploration and Development of Space.
 In February 2018, Bezos was elected to the National Academy of Engineering for "leadership and innovation in space exploration, autonomous systems, and building a commercial pathway for human space flight".
 In March 2018, at the Explorers Club annual dinner, he was awarded the Buzz Aldrin Space Exploration Award in recognition of his work with Blue Origin.
 He received Germany's 2018 Axel Springer Award for Business Innovation and Social Responsibility. Time magazine named him one of the 100 most influential people in the world on five separate occasions between 2008 and 2018.
In February 2023, Bezos was presented with the Légion d’honneur, the highest French order of merit. Bezos had been designated a member of the Legion d’Honneur about 10 years earlier but was not available to collect it.

Wealth 

Bezos first became a millionaire in 1997 after raising $54 million through Amazon's initial public offering (IPO). He was first included on the Forbes World's Billionaires list in 1999 with a registered net worth of $10.1 billion. His net worth decreased to $6.1 billion a year later, a 40.5% drop. His wealth plummeted even more the following year, dropping 66.6% to $2.0 billion. He lost $500 million the following year, which brought his net worth down to $1.5 billion. The following year, his net worth increased by 66.66% to $2.5 billion. From 2005 to 2007, he quadrupled his net worth to $8.7 billion. After the financial crisis and succeeding economic recession, his net worth would decrease to $6.8 billion—a 17.7% drop. His wealth rose by 85.2% in 2010, leaving him with $12.6 billion. This percentage increase ascended him to the 43rd spot on the ranking from 68th.

After a rumor broke out that Amazon was developing a smartphone, Bezos's net worth rose to $30.5 billion in 2014. A year later, Bezos entered the top ten when he increased his net worth to a total of $50.3 billion. Bezos rose to be the 5th richest person in the world hours before market close; he gained $7 billion in one hour. By the time the Forbes list was calculated in March 2016, his net worth was registered at $45.2 billion. However, just months later in October 2016, his wealth increased by $16.2 billion to $66.5 billion, unofficially ranking him the third-richest person in the world, behind Warren Buffett. After sporadic jumps in Amazon's share price, in July 2017 he briefly unseated Microsoft cofounder Bill Gates as the wealthiest person in the world.

Bezos would continue to sporadically surpass Gates throughout the month of October 2017 after Amazon's share price fluctuated. His net worth surpassed $100 billion for the first time on November 24, 2017, after Amazon's share price increased by more than 2.5%. When the 2017 list was issued, Bezos's net worth was registered at $72.8 billion, adding $27.6 billion from the previous year. Bezos was officially ranked as the third-wealthiest person in the world, up from the 5th spot in 2016. His wealth's rapid growth from 2016 to 2017 sparked a variety of assessments about how much money Bezos earned on a controlled, reduced time scale. On October 10, 2017, he made an estimated $6.24 billion in 5 minutes, slightly less than the annual gross domestic product of Kyrgyzstan.

On March 6, 2018, Bezos was designated the wealthiest person in the world, with a registered net worth of $112 billion. He unseated Bill Gates ($90 billion), who was $6 billion ahead of Warren Buffett ($84 billion), ranked third. He is considered the first registered centi-billionaire (not adjusted for inflation).

His wealth, in 2017–18 terms, equaled that of 2.7 million Americans. Bezos's net worth increased by $33.6 billion from January 2017 to January 2018. This increase outstripped the economic development (in GDP terms) of more than 96 countries around the world. During March 9, Bezos earned $230,000 every 60 seconds. The Motley Fool estimated that if Bezos had not sold any of his shares from its original public offering in 1997, his net worth would sit at $181 billion in 2018. According to Quartz, his net worth of $150 billion in July 2018 was enough to purchase the entire stock markets of Nigeria, Hungary, Egypt, Luxembourg, and Iran. Following the report by Quartz, Amazon workers in Poland, (Germany), and Spain participated in demonstrations and labor strikes to draw attention to his growing wealth and the lack of compensation, labor rights, and satisfactory working conditions of select Amazon workers. On July 17, 2018, he was designated the "wealthiest person in modern history" by the Bloomberg Billionaires Index, Fortune, MarketWatch, The Wall Street Journal, and Forbes.

In 2019, Bezos's wealth was reduced by the divorce from his wife MacKenzie Bezos. According to Forbes, had the Washington state common law applied to their divorce without a prenuptial agreement, Bezos's wealth could have been equitably divided with his ex-wife; however, she eventually received 25% of Bezos's Amazon shares, valued at approximately $36 billion, making her the third-richest woman in the world. Bezos retained his interest in The Washington Post and Blue Origin, as well as voting control of the shares received by his ex-wife.

In June 2019, Bezos purchased three adjoining apartments overlooking Madison Square Park in Manhattan, including a penthouse, for a combined total of US$80 million, making this one of the most expensive real estate purchases within New York City in 2019. Bezos had also purchased three adjoining apartments at 25 Central Park West in Manhattan for $7.65 million in 1999; he bought a fourth unit in that building for $5.3 million in 2012.

In February 2020, Bezos purchased the Warner Estate from David Geffen for $165 million, a record price paid for a residence in the Los Angeles area. The previous record high price of $150 million was paid by Lachlan Murdoch for the Chartwell Mansion. During the COVID-19 pandemic, it was reported that Bezos's fortune had grown by $24 billion, citing a surge in demand from households on lockdown shopping on Amazon. He further expanded his residential holdings in February 2022, purchasing a $16.13-million-dollar apartment at a 24-story boutique condominium, located across from Madison Square Park in the Flatiron neighbourhood, where he already owns all the units on the top floors.

Bezos is the owner of the Y721, a luxury superyacht estimated to cost more than $500,000,000. Once built, it will be the largest yacht in the world.

Criticism 
Bezos is known for creating an adversarial environment at Amazon, as well as insulting and verbally abusing his employees. As journalist Brad Stone revealed in his book The Everything Store, Bezos issued remarks to his employees such as "I'm sorry, did I take my stupid pills today?", "Are you lazy or just incompetent?", and "Why are you ruining my life?". Additionally, Bezos reportedly pitted Amazon teams against each other, and once declined to give Amazon employees city bus passes in order to discourage them from leaving the office. 

Throughout his early years of ownership of The Washington Post, Bezos was accused of having a potential conflict of interest with the paper. Bezos and the newspaper's editorial board have dismissed accusations that he unfairly controlled the paper's content and Bezos maintains the paper's independence. Bezos treatment of employees at The Washington Post has also drawn scrutiny. In 2013, more than 400 Washington Post employees wrote an open letter to Bezos criticizing his poor wages and benefits for his employees. The letter demanded "Fair wages; fair benefits for retirement, family leave and health care; and a fair amount of job security”.

Personal life 

In 1992, Bezos was working for D. E. Shaw in Manhattan when he met novelist MacKenzie Tuttle, who was a research associate at the firm; the couple married a year later. In 1994, they moved across the country to Seattle, Washington, where Bezos founded Amazon. Bezos and his now ex-wife MacKenzie are the parents of four children: three sons and one daughter adopted from China. Bezos and MacKenzie have not disclosed their religious status. Public records, family history, and biographical details suggest that both were raised under some form of Christianity.

In March 2003, Bezos was a passenger in a helicopter that crashed in West Texas while surveying land to buy for Blue Origin; the other 3 occupants in the helicopter were pilot Charles "Cheater" Bella, Amazon lawyer Elizabeth Korrell, and local rancher Ty Holland. All survived; Bezos sustained only minor injuries and was discharged from a local hospital the same day.

Bezos portrayed a Starfleet official in the 2016 movie Star Trek Beyond, and joined the cast and crew at a San Diego Comic-Con screening. He had lobbied Paramount for the role apropos of Alexa and his personal/professional interest in speech recognition. His one line consisted of a response to an alien in distress: "Speak Normally." In his initial discussion of the project which became Alexa with his technical advisor Greg Hart in 2011, Bezos told him that the goal was to create "the Star Trek computer." Bezos's family corporation Zefram LLC is named after Zefram Cochrane, a character from Star Trek.

In January 2019, Bezos and his wife Mackenzie released a joint statement which revealed that they would be getting divorced after 25 years together. Subsequently, National Enquirer revealed that Bezos had an affair with media personality Lauren Sánchez; the affair with Sanchez had lasted for months. Later, Bezos published an online essay on February 7, 2019, in which he accused American Media, Inc. owner David Pecker of "extortion and blackmail" for threatening to publish intimate photos of Bezos and current girlfriend Lauren Sánchez if he did not stop his investigation into how his text messages and other photos had been leaked to the National Enquirer. Media reports have accused Sanchez's brother Michael of being the source for the photos obtained by National Enquirer; however, Bezos has speculated that it may have been the Saudi Arabian government.

On April 4, 2019, the divorce was finalized, with Bezos keeping 75% of the couple's Amazon stock and MacKenzie getting the remaining 25% ($35.6 billion) in Amazon stock. However, Bezos would keep all of the couple's voting rights.

Politics 

According to public campaign finance records, Bezos supported the electoral campaigns of Patty Murray and Maria Cantwell, two Democratic U.S. senators from Washington. He has also supported Democrats U.S. representative John Conyers, as well as Patrick Leahy and Republican Spencer Abraham, U.S. senators serving on committees dealing with Internet-related issues. Jeff Bezos and MacKenzie Bezos have supported the legalization of same-sex marriage, and in 2012 contributed $2.5 million to Washington United for Marriage, a group supporting a yes vote on Washington Referendum 74, which affirmed a same-sex marriage law enacted in the state. Bezos donated $100,000 towards a movement against a Washington state income tax in 2010 for "top earners". In 2012, he donated to Amazon's political action committee (PAC), which has given $56,000 and $74,500 to Democrats and Republicans, respectively.

After the 2016 presidential election, Bezos was invited to join Donald Trump's Defense Innovation Advisory Board, an advisory council to improve the technology used by the Defense Department. Trump has repeatedly attacked Bezos via Twitter, accused Bezos of avoiding corporate taxes, gaining undue political influence, and undermining his presidency by spreading "fake news".

In 2014, Amazon won a bid for a cloud computing contract with the CIA valued at $600 million. A 2018, $10 billion contract known as the Joint Enterprise Defense Infrastructure (JEDI) project, this time with the Pentagon, was allegedly written up in a way that favors Amazon. Controversy over this was raised when General James Mattis accepted a headquarters tour invitation from Bezos and co-ordinated the deal through Sally Donnelly, a lobbyist who previously worked for Amazon. In November 2019, when the contract was awarded to Microsoft instead, Amazon filed a lawsuit with allegations that the bidding process was biased. On July 6, 2021, the Pentagon cancelled the JEDI contract with Microsoft, citing that "due to evolving requirements, increased cloud conversancy, and industry advances, the JEDI Cloud contract no longer meets its needs." Despite Bezos's support for an open borders policy towards immigrants, Amazon has actively marketed facial recognition software to U.S. Immigration and Customs Enforcement (ICE).

In 2019, a political action committee linked to Bezos spent over $1 million in an unsuccessful attempt to defeat the reelection bid of Seattle city council member and activist Kshama Sawant.

On November 22, 2021, Jeff Bezos donated $100 million to the Obama Foundation to "help expand the scope of programming that reaches emerging leaders", and requested the Obama Presidential Center's plaza to be named after John Lewis.

Saudi hacking claim 

In March 2018, Bezos met in Seattle with Mohammad bin Salman, the crown prince and de facto ruler of Saudi Arabia, to discuss investment opportunities for Saudi Vision 2030. In March 2019, Bezos's security consultant accused the Saudi government of hacking Bezos's phone. According to BBC, Bezos's top security staffer, Gavin de Becker, "linked the hack to the Washington Posts coverage of the murder of Saudi writer Jamal Khashoggi at the Saudi consulate in Istanbul". Khashoggi, a Saudi journalist and dissident was employed as a writer at the Washington Post, owned by Bezos. Khashoggi was killed in late 2018, in Turkey's Saudi consulate for his critical stance and journalism against the Saudi government and its leader.

In January 2020, The Guardian reported that the hack was initiated before the murder but after Khashoggi wrote critically about the crown prince in the Washington Post. Forensic analysis of Bezos's mobile phone conducted by advisory firm FTI Consulting, concluded it "highly probable" that the hack was achieved using a malicious file hidden in a video sent in a WhatsApp message to Bezos from the personal account of the crown prince on May 1, 2018. Saudi Arabia has denied the claim.

Philanthropy 

Bezos donated to the Fred Hutchinson Cancer Research Center several times between 2009 and 2017. In 2013, he pledged $500,000 to Worldreader, a non-profit founded by a former Amazon employee.

In September 2018, Business Insider reported that Bezos was the only one of the top five billionaires in the world who had not signed the Giving Pledge, an initiative created by Bill Gates and Warren Buffett that encourages wealthy people to give away a majority of their wealth. That same month, Janet Camarena, director of transparency initiatives at Foundation Center, was quoted by CNBC as having questions about Bezos's new , including the fund's structure and how exactly it will be funded.

In May 2017, Bezos gave $1 million to the Reporters Committee for Freedom of the Press, which provides pro bono legal services for American journalists. On June 15, 2017, he posted a message on Twitter asking for ideas for philanthropy: "I'm thinking about a philanthropy strategy that is the opposite of how I mostly spend my time—working on the long term". At the time of the post, Bezos's lifetime spending on charitable causes was estimated to be $100 million. Multiple opinion columnists responded by asking Bezos to pay higher wages to Amazon warehouse workers. A year later in June, he tweeted that he would announce two philanthropic foci by the end of summer 2018. Bezos announced in September 2018 that he would commit approximately $2 billion to a fund to deal with American homelessness and establish a network of non-profit preschools for low income communities. As part of this announcement, he committed to establishing the "Day 1 Families Fund" to finance "night shelters and day care centers for homeless families" and the "Day 1 Academies Fund" for early childhood education.

In January 2018, Bezos made a $33 million donation to TheDream.US, a college scholarship fund for undocumented immigrants brought to the United States as minors. In June 2018, Bezos donated to Breakthrough Energy Ventures, a private philanthropic fund founded by Bill Gates aimed at promoting emissions-free energy. In September 2018, Bezos donated $10 million to With Honor, a nonpartisan organization that works to increase the number of veterans in political office.

In February 2020, Bezos pledged $10 billion to combat climate change through the Bezos Earth Fund. Later that year, in November, Bezos announced $791M of donations to established, well-known groups, with $100M each going to Environmental Defense Fund, Natural Resources Defense Council, The Nature Conservancy, World Resources Institute and World Wildlife Fund, and the remainder going to 11 other groups. In April 2020, early in the COVID-19 pandemic, Bezos donated $100 million to food banks through Feeding America. In November 2021, Bezos pledged to donate $2 billion towards restructuring food systems and nature conservation at the 2021 United Nations Climate Change Conference.

Bezos Academy is a group of tuition-free preschools for students from low-income families, which was created by Bezos, and which operate in a manner similar to the Montessori method.

In November 2022, Bezos granted a $100-million Courage and Civility Award to singer Dolly Parton in recognition of her charity work focused on improving children's literacy around the world.

On November 22, 2022, Jeff Bezos awarded $123 million to organizations that are engaged in relocating homeless families to permanent housing. Day 1 Families Fund grants, the amounts of which vary in monetary terms, will be sent to 40 organizations across the country.

See also 
 List of Princeton University alumni
 List of richest Americans in history
 List of Time Person of the Year recipients
 The World's Billionaires

Notes

References

Sources

Further reading 

 
 Davenport, Christian (2018). The Space Barons: Elon Musk, Jeff Bezos, and the Quest to Colonize the Cosmos. PublicAffairs. .
 
 Fernholz, Tim (2018). Rocket Billionaires: Elon Musk, Jeff Bezos, and the New Space Race. Houghton Mifflin Harcourt. .
 Leibovich, Mark. The New Imperialists (Prentice Hall, 2002) pp 55–104.online

External links 

 
 
 
 
 Forbes Profile

1964 births
Living people
20th-century American businesspeople
20th-century American engineers
21st-century American businesspeople
21st-century American engineers
Amazon (company) people
American adoptees
American aerospace businesspeople
American astronauts
American billionaires
American chairpersons of corporations
American computer businesspeople
American computer programmers
American Internet company founders
American investors
American manufacturing businesspeople
American mass media owners
American online retailer founders
American people of Danish descent
American philanthropists
American software engineers
American technology chief executives
American technology company founders
American venture capitalists
Blue Origin people
Businesspeople from Albuquerque, New Mexico
Businesspeople from Houston
Businesspeople from Miami
Businesspeople from Seattle
Commercial astronauts
Fellows of the American Academy of Arts and Sciences
Life extensionists
Miami Palmetto Senior High School alumni
New Shepard passengers
People from Albuquerque, New Mexico
People from Medina, Washington
People from Mercer Island, Washington
People in the space industry
People who have flown in suborbital spaceflight
Princeton University School of Engineering and Applied Science alumni
Space advocates
Time Person of the Year
The Washington Post publishers
Centibillionaires